Derek Sherinian (born August 25, 1966) is an American keyboardist who has toured and recorded for Alice Cooper, Billy Idol, and Joe Bonamassa, among others. He was also a member of Dream Theater from 1994 to 1999, is the founder of Planet X and also one of the founding members of Black Country Communion and Sons of Apollo. He has released eight solo albums that have featured a variety of prominent guest musicians, including guitarists Slash, Yngwie Malmsteen, Allan Holdsworth, Steve Lukather, Joe Bonamassa, Billy Sheehan, Zakk Wylde and Al Di Meola.

Sherinian has distinguished himself by his versatility, and aggressive "guitaristic" approach to his signature keyboard style.  MusicRadar.com declared, "A true shredder, his virtuoso playing has seen him dubbed the keyboard-playing version of Eddie Van Halen." In 2021, he was voted "Greatest Keyboardist Of The 21st Century", and #8 Greatest of All Time by MusicRadar.com. In 2022, and 2020, he was voted No. 1 Keyboardist in Japan's BURRN! Magazine. In 2018, he was voted No. 9 Greatest Keyboardist Ever in PROG Magazine. He has also appeared on the cover of numerous keyboard magazines around the world, including the November 2011 issue of Keyboard Magazine, which declared Sherinian a "Keyboard Hero for a New Generation". He has also been called the "King of the Keys" by Guitar World magazine and the "Caligula of Keyboards" by Alice Cooper. His musical influences include Elton John, Edward Van Halen and Jan Hammer.

Early life

Born in Laguna Beach, California, Sherinian is of Greek and Armenian descent. He began taking piano lessons at age five in Santa Cruz, California. After his junior year at Soquel High School, he received a scholarship to the Berklee College of Music in Boston where he was the roommate of future Megadeth guitarist and Trans-Siberian Orchestra musical director Al Pitrelli. He has since studied with other keyboardists, including Mitchel Forman, T Lavitz, Russell Ferrante, and Alex Alessandroni.

Professional career

Buddy Miles
Sherinian's first professional gig after leaving Boston was with ex-Jimi Hendrix Band of Gypsies drummer Buddy Miles touring the Chitlin' Circuit. Sherinian paid tribute to Miles covering his song "Them Changes" featuring Joe Bonamassa on his 2020 solo album "The Phoenix".

Alice Cooper
Sherinian received his first big break with Alice Cooper in 1989 to tour in support of the platinum selling Trash album. Sherinian toured and recorded with Cooper on and off until 1998. Cooper said of Sherinian, "Derek Sherinian will be at least one chapter in my book when I write my autobiography. He is the Caligula of the keyboards. He was born with the rock star charisma. Reeking of self-esteem, he walked into our first rehearsal for the 'Trash' tour and flawlessly auditioned by playing every classic Bob Ezrin keyboard part to the note. Ten years later and thousands of exchanged poker chips later, the two of us have probably broken even. He once pulled four twos on the bullet train from Japan, and won a huge poker pot. I'll always remember that day... him jumping up on the very conservative bullet train, screaming that he'd pulled four twos, which is an awfully good hand in poker.

Dream Theater

In 1994, Sherinian replaced Kevin Moore in the progressive metal/progressive rock band Dream Theater, originally just for the band's promotional tour for Awake. In February 1995, however, he was made a full-time member of the band. Dream Theater guitarist John Petrucci added "...Derek -considering the fact that he's heavily into guitarists and rock music, his history, and the range of all the great guitarists he's worked with —plays with a fire unheard of from most keyboardists." He recorded the albums A Change of Seasons (1995), Falling into Infinity (1997), and Once in a LIVEtime (1998) with Dream Theater before being replaced in January 1999 by Jordan Rudess due to creative differences and turmoil within the band. 
Sherinian reunited with Dream Theater for a one-off concert in 2004, which was recorded and released as When Dream and Day Reunite (2004). The band's performance of "Metropolis Pt. 1" featured an extended improvisation between Sherinian, Rudess, and guitarist John Petrucci.

During the late 1990s, Sherinian released two albums with the progressive rock supergroup Platypus, which also featured Dream Theater bassist John Myung, Dixie Dregs drummer Rod Morgenstein, and King's X guitarist Ty Tabor. The group released two albums, When Pus Comes to Shove (1998) and Ice Cycles (2000), before disbanding in 2000.
In 2002, he was part of the band Jughead, which also included Tabor, bassist/vocalist Matt Bissonette and drummer Gregg Bissonette.
In January 2012, Sherinian performed at two shows with instrumental supergroup Mike Portnoy, Billy Sheehan, and Tony MacAlpine (PSMS) for the Guitar Center Drum Off, and Sabian Live. In the fall of that year, PSMS began rehearsing for a tour and a video of their rehearsal was released on DVD as "InstruMENTAL Inspiration". They toured Europe and Asia concluding with a live DVD/CD "Live in Tokyo" released on September 24, 2013. In 2014, PSMS performed two songs at the TAMA 40th Anniversary Party at NAMM January 25, and also the Progressive Nation at Sea cruise on the Norwegian Pearl February 18–22, co-promoted by Sherinian and Portnoy.

Solo career

Since 1999, Sherinian has recorded eight solo albums, featuring performances by numerous highly acclaimed musicians.

Sherinian's first solo album, Planet X (1999), written and recorded with Australian drummer Virgil Donati, led to the formation of a band of the same name (Planet X). Guitar virtuoso Tony MacAlpine was recruited to complete the band. Sherinian has stated that his intention when forming Planet X was to create a group of musicians that "played their instruments so fiercely that they would strike fear in the hearts of all musicians". In 2017, the short documentary "Return to Planet X" reflecting on the making of this album.

In 2001, Sherinian teamed with drummer Simon Phillips and guitarists Steve Lukather and Zakk Wylde to record Inertia, followed by Black Utopia (2003). For Black Utopia, three new faces joined Sherinian's group: bassist Billy Sheehan, rock guitarist Yngwie Malmsteen, and jazz fusion guitarist Al Di Meola. With respect to this fusion-influenced lineup, Sherinian stated:
 
Sherinian also called the album "a lot darker and heavier than [Inertia]".

Sherinian extended further into the fusion realm by collaborating with guitarist Allan Holdsworth and violinist Jerry Goodman (formerly of the Mahavishnu Orchestra) on Mythology (2004). In addition to another appearance by Phillips, other musicians appearing on this recording were Zakk Wylde, John Sykes, Steve Stevens, and Tony Franklin.
Holdsworth said of the session, "When Derek was finishing his album, he told me he’d love for me to play a guitar solo on it, so I did. I recorded a solo for him in the specific length that he requested, and he put it on that track [which also features Zakk Wylde]. People have told me they really like that guitar solo, but I haven’t heard it in years so I don’t remember it. [laughs]"

Since 2002, Sherinian has toured with several well-known artists, including Billy Idol and Yngwie Malmsteen. Derek's fifth solo album, Blood of the Snake (2006), features contributions from Idol, as well as Guns N' Roses guitarist Slash, John Petrucci of Dream Theater, and Brian Tichy; Phillips, Franklin and Lukather make return appearances. A video for a cover version of Mungo Jerry's "In the Summertime" was released along with the album. Sherinian also worked with duduk master Djivan Gasparyan on the song "Prelude To Battle" on the release, written for his great grandmother who survived the Armenian genocide. In 2009, Sherinian released his sixth solo album, Molecular Heinosity, again featuring Zakk Wylde, Tony Franklin and Brian Tichy. Later that year, Sherinian also performed a one-off acoustic gig with Alice in Chains to launch their Black Gives Way to Blue album.

In September 2011, Sherinian released his seventh solo album titled Oceana, reuniting with Simon Phillips and Steve Lukather, and featuring a guest appearance from BCC bandmate Joe Bonamassa.

In 2019, Sherinian signed a new solo deal with Sony Music, and released The Phoenix September 18, 2020. He also appeared on two Whitesnake albums (The Rock Album and Love Songs) as part of the Red, White, and Blue Trilogy. In 2021, Sherinian guested on the Michael Schenker Group album Immortal on the song "Drilled to Kill" and appeared on the lyric video. Schenker said of Sherinian's performance: "Derek and myself trading solos, it sounds unexpected and beyond my expectation [...] Absolutely fantastic!". Sherinian is finishing his 9th solo album, scheduled for Spring 2022 release with Simon Phillips. Michael Schenker, Joe Bonamassa, Steve Lukather, Steve Stevens. Mike Stern. Jeff Berlin will be appearing.

Black Country Communion

In 2009, Sherinian became a founding member of supergroup Black Country Communion with Glenn Hughes, Jason Bonham, and Joe Bonamassa. releasing their debut Black Country in 2010. In 2011, he performed on a second Black Country Communion record titled 2, followed with a nine-week tour of the United States and Europe. Sherinian recorded with Black Country Communion on their third studio release Afterglow. The band split up in September 2012 due to Bonamassa's solo touring schedule leaving little time for performing with Black Country Communion. Sherinian went on to join Bonamassa's solo band in July 2013 until December 2014. BCC reunited in 2017 to record their fourth album.

Whitesnake
Sherinian was hired by David Coverdale to replace the original keyboards on the previously released Whitesnake albums Slip of the Tongue and Restless Heart. Sherinian's performances resulted on the Red, White, and Blues Trilogy compilation records, containing the albums The Rock Album (2020), Love Songs (2020), and The Blues Album (2021). Whitesnake singer David Coverdale explained, "One of the things that's very noticeable; it's all '80s keyboards, which I can't stand. They totally date it. Thank god, I found Derek Sherinian, who — and I know he won't mind me saying this — Derek's like the illegitimate son of Jon Lord. He just played his ass off for us, and you can hear it."

April 2004, Sherinian was invited by ex-Whitesnake guitarist John Sykes to play three shows in Japan with Marco Mendoza bass, Tommy Aldridge on drums. The live album John Sykes (2004) "Bad Boy Live" was from this tour. Sykes later guested on the song "God of War" with Zakk Wylde on Sherinian's (2004) "Mythology" record.

Sons of Apollo
In August 2017, he and Mike Portnoy joined forces to form, a progressive metal supergroup named Sons of Apollo and also featuring Billy Sheehan, vocalist Jeff Scott Soto and guitarist Ron "Bumblefoot" Thal. Sons of Apollo released their debut album Psychotic Symphony on October 21, 2017, followed by a world tour of 83 shows in 23 countries. Sons of Apollo released their second album, "MMXX", in January 2020 co-produced once again by Sherinian and Mike Portnoy.

Guest live appearances

Kiss
On the recommendation of Eric Singer, Sherinian was hired to play off-stage keyboards on Kiss' Revenge Tour. Sherinian is on the Alive III live album and also guested with Kiss on the song "Do You Remember Rock & Roll Radio?" on the Ramones tribute album We're a Happy Family.

Alice in Chains
July 14, 2009, Sherinian performed a one-off acoustic gig at Ricardo Montalbán Theatre in Hollywood with Alice in Chains to launch their Black Gives Way to Blue album.

Dorians
September 10, 2012, Sherinian was special guest to the Armenian band Dorians performing a concert in Yerevan and the first rock concert ever in Artsakh. On September 13, 2012 Glenn Hughes and Sherinian met Bako Sahakyan, the president of de facto independent Nagorno-Karabakh Republic and organized a concert there. After his visit to Artsakh, Sherinian was placed on the Azerbaijan black list due to conflict between the two countries.

Black Label Society
March 6, 2013, Sherinian was a special guest keyboardist with Black Label Society for their Unblackened acoustic set at the Club Nokia in Los Angeles. The performance aired live on AXS TV, and was released in September 2013 on CD/DVD/Blu-ray formats. Zakk Wylde officially "patched" Sherinian in as president of the Black Label Society Burbank Chapter.

Tony MacAlpine Benefit
December 12, 2015, Sherinian co-organized and participated in the Tony MacAlpine Benefit Concert at the Wiltern Theater in L.A. backing up Zakk Wylde along with Mike Portnoy and Billy Sheehan.

Generation Axe
Sherinian was personally invited by guitarists Steve Vai, and Yngwie Malmsteen to join the Generation Axe Asia / A Night of Guitars Tour also featuring Zakk Wylde, Nuno Bettencourt, and Tosin Abasi.

Influences and acclaim from other artists

In a 2000 interview, Sherinian cited his early keyboard influences as being Jan Hammer (Mahavishnu Orchestra), Jon Lord (Deep Purple), Keith Emerson (Emerson, Lake & Palmer and The Nice), Rick Wakeman (Yes), and Elton John. Other influences include guitarists Allan Holdsworth, Jeff Beck, and Eddie Van Halen. Sherinian said," When it comes to soloing, I have always been influenced and inspired by the great guitarists, specifically Edward Van Halen, Allan Holdsworth, Yngwie Malmsteen, Randy Rhoads, Jeff Beck, Michael Schenker. You can hear elements of all of these players in my DNA. I have managed to take my favorite qualities of all these great players, and process through my instrument, creating a totally unique signature style." Sherinian enjoys co-writing material with fellow musicians, and often finds that he writes better material with drummers. Sherinian cites Van Halen's guitar playing as having a direct influence on his aggressive unique approach to keyboards in terms of technique as well as tone; his unique signature lead patches contain numerous elements of guitar sounds such as distortion, harmonics, and palm-muting, eventually leading to playing a gig with Eddie for a party at Van Halen's home in 2006, of which Sherinian said "It was the highlight of my career, it was completely surreal." Sherinian's work with noted Toto guitarist Steve Lukather on the 2001 solo CD Inertia was cited by Lukather as "probably my best recorded work in my whole career. Great record! I'm very proud of it!".

Sherinian's collaborations with top musicians were featured in a 2007 article in Guitar World magazine, where guitarist Zakk Wylde offered, "People want to play with him because he's that good. He can play everything from the easiest licks on a piano to the most complex Beethoven sonatas with ease." Sherinian explains that he enlists a variety of guitarists because he "[does not] think there is one guitarist who can cover all the styles featured on [the] albums." Sherinian often tailors songs for specific guitarists, such as Holdsworth and Wylde for "Day of the Dead" (off Mythology); in this respect, he seeks to take certain aspects of genres and make them "collide in an eloquent way".

Equipment

Sherinian uses vintage instruments, primarily the Hammond organ, Moog, Rhodes, and Nord Lead 3 mixed in with some modern sounds. He endorses Korg, Clavia, and Dexibell keyboards. Sherinian was presented the G2 Modular synth serial number 001 by Clavia representative Bengt Lilja in January 2004. As a Korg endorsee, Sherinian was one of the first artists to adopt the Korg Trinity keyboard series in 1996. In collaboration with KORG sound designer Jack Hotop, they created Sherinian's signature "guitaristic" lead sound (the "Monster Lead", made famous on the Dream Theater album "Falling into Infinity") on the Trinity, as well as other, more "modern" and "aggressive" keyboard patches, owing to his fondness of guitar tones and technique.
He also uses the Hammond B3 organ; he thinks that "every rock keyboardist should have a B3 and overdriven Leslie as part of their sound."

Sherinian is also known for being one of the first keyboardists to use vertical keyboard stands, influencing a new generation of keyboardists.

Selected discography

Movie appearances
1992: Wayne's World – as himself, as part of Alice Cooper

References

External links
Official website
Derek Sherinian interview on Rockpages.gr
A more detailed list of equipment can be found at Sherinian's website)
A complete list of projects is at Sherinian's website and the AllMusic credits page.
Live version of "Atlantis: Apocalypse 1470 BC"

1966 births
21st-century American keyboardists
Living people
Alice Cooper (band) members
American heavy metal keyboardists
American people of Armenian descent
American people of Greek descent
Berklee College of Music alumni
Dream Theater members
Black Country Communion members
Musicians from Santa Cruz, California
Explorers Club (band) members
Planet X (band) members
Yngwie J. Malmsteen's Rising Force members
20th-century American keyboardists
Inside Out Music artists
Magna Carta Records artists